Kenyan–Finnish relations are bilateral relations between Kenya and Finland.

History
Finland recognised Kenya on December 13, 1963. Both countries established diplomatic relations on June 14, 1965. Finland recognises that Kenya is a key in maintaining regional stability and that Kenya has the largest and most diverse economy in the region.

Development cooperation
In 2014 total development assistance stood at €13.9 million.

Through development assistance in Kenya the Finnish govt hopes to achieve:
 A society that accounts for human rights
 Poverty reduction
 Improve management of forest and water resources

To achieve this, 
 A Local Cooperation Fund (LCF) has been set up, the fund is granted to NGOs involved in achieving good governance and human rights. A total of €11.6 million has been set to achieve this between 2013 and 2016.
 €24.8 million to develop agriculture in Kenya. 
 €21.4 million in 2013–2016 has been reserved to improve management of forest and water resources.

Trade
In 2013 trade between Finland and Kenya stood at €35 million. Kenya exported goods worth €17 million to Finland and in turn Finland exported goods worth €18 million.
Kenya exported goods consisting of horticultural products, tea and coffee, Finland mainly exported information communication technology and power plant equipment.

In 2014 both countries also signed a double taxation pact to promote trade and investment.

In 2013, 2,000 Finns visited Kenya while the Kenyan community in Finland stands at about 700.

Resident diplomatic missions
 Finland has an embassy in Nairobi and an honorary consulate in Mombasa.
 Kenya is accredited to Finland from its embassy in Stockholm, Sweden.

External links 
  Ministry for Foreign Affairs of Finland about Kenya

See also 
 Foreign relations of Finland
 Foreign relations of Kenya

References

 
Kenya
Finland